The SunTrust International Center is a building in Downtown Miami, Florida, United States. It is located in the heart of the Central Business District, on Southeast 1st Street near 3rd Avenue. It is one block west of Biscayne Boulevard. The tower rises from a six-story parking pedestal, and consists of 31 floors. It is 125 m (375 ft) in height, which gives it a very low position on the list of tallest buildings in Miami. However, as the building opened in 1973, it appears in most photos of the Miami skyline, and is one of the more famous buildings in the city. However, since the completion of 50 Biscayne, the tower is obstructed if seen from Biscayne Bay. The building is the Miami headquarters of SunTrust Bank and is almost entirely composed of Class A office space. It was built by The Auchter Company. 

Crocker Partners acquired the building for $82.4 million in 2011. In May 2018, PCCP bought it for $127 million using a $101.8 million mortgage from Invesco.

The nearest Metromover stations are Inner Loop and Bayfront Park.

References

External links 

SunTrust International Center on Emporis
Official Website

Office buildings completed in 1973
Skyscraper office buildings in Miami

RTKL Associates buildings
Leadership in Energy and Environmental Design basic silver certified buildings
1973 establishments in Florida